Diana Nazarova (born 2 June 2000) is a Kazakhstani swimmer.

In 2019, she represented Kazakhstan at the 2019 World Aquatics Championships held in Gwangju, South Korea. She competed in the women's 50 metre backstroke and women's 100 metre backstroke events.

References 

Living people
2000 births
Place of birth missing (living people)
Kazakhstani female backstroke swimmers
Swimmers at the 2018 Summer Youth Olympics
Swimmers at the 2020 Summer Olympics
Olympic swimmers of Kazakhstan